An elementary number is one formalization of the concept of a closed-form number.  The elementary numbers form an algebraically closed field containing the roots of arbitrary equations using field operations, exponentiation, and logarithms. The set of the elementary numbers is subdivided into the explicit elementary numbers and the implicit elementary numbers.

References 

 
 
 
 

Algebraic number theory